Copley Township is one of the nine townships of Summit County, Ohio, United States.  The 2000 census found 13,641 people in the township.

Geography
Located in the western part of the county, it borders the following townships and cities:
Bath Township - north
Fairlawn - northeast
Akron - east
Norton - south
Wadsworth Township, Medina County - southwest corner
Sharon Township, Medina County - west
Granger Township, Medina County - northwest corner

Several populated places are located in Copley Township:
The census-designated place of Pigeon Creek, in the northwest
The unincorporated community of Montrose, on the northern boundary with Bath Township

Parts of the original Copley Township are now in Akron or Fairlawn.

A formerly rural township located west of the county seat of Akron, Copley Township has become increasingly suburban over the last few decades.

Name and history
It is the only Copley Township statewide.

Copley was originally called Greenfield, after Gardiner Green (son-in-law of painter John Singleton Copley), who owned a large portion of the township.  Later on he changed the name to Copley, the maiden name of his wife.

Fairlawn was founded as a hamlet in Copley in 1891 when the Northern Ohio Railway was built.  As of 1908 it had a mill, general store, a blacksmith, and other businesses.

On August 7, 2011, a series of shootings occurred in Copley Township which resulted in the deaths of 7 people, and the injury of another. The perpetrator, Michael E. Hance, was shot and killed by rifle by Copley Township police officer Ben Campbell, who received the call while off-duty.

Economy

Copley Township's economy is based on several strip malls, chemical plants, and agricultural businesses.  The rest of the township is dotted with farms and subdivisions.

Government
The township is governed by a three-member board of trustees, who are elected in November of odd-numbered years to a four-year term beginning on the following January 1. Two are elected in the year after the presidential election and one is elected in the year before it. There is also an elected township fiscal officer, who serves a four-year term beginning on April 1 of the year after the election, which is held in November of the year before the presidential election. Vacancies in the fiscal officership or on the board of trustees are filled by the remaining trustees.

Notable natives and residents
John F. Seiberling, U.S. Representative from Ohio
Betty Sutton, U.S. Representative from Ohio
Carrie Coon, actress
Frank LaRose, Ohio Secretary of State
Josh Williams, defender for the Columbus Crew

Education
The school system in the township is shared with Fairlawn and has a set of three elementary schools, one middle school, and one high school, Copley High School.

Superfund
In 1990, Copley Square Plaza was designated a superfund site after tetrachloroethylene and other contaminates from a dry cleaners were found in the soil.

References

External links
Township website
County website
School district website

Townships in Summit County, Ohio
Townships in Ohio